Ward Centers, formerly known as Victoria Ward Centers, is a shopping complex near Waikiki at Kaka'ako in Honolulu, Hawai'i.  Ward Centers is a retail hub as host to Ward Entertainment Center, Ward Centre, Ward Farmers Market, Ward Gateway Center, Ward Village Shops, Ward Warehouse and a new, multimillion-dollar 150,000 square foot (14,000 m2) entertainment center.  The theater complex, owned by Consolidated Theatres, and high tech midway opened in 2001.

Transformation to Ward Village 
The Howard Hughes Corporation plans to transform Ward Centers into Ward Village over the next decade. In addition to retail, Ward Village will feature residential towers.

Early history
Victoria Ward was the wife of Honolulu industrialist Curtis Perry Ward and daughter of influential British shipbuilder James Robinson. Victoria Ward and her husband owned a vast estate (over 100 acres) in central Honolulu that stretched from Thomas Square to the shores of Ala Moana. On the estate was their mansion, Old Plantation, the site of the present-day Neal S. Blaisdell Center. In 1882, Curtis Perry Ward died and left his holdings to his wife and daughters. Victoria Ward continued the family business, purchasing real estate which would be developed for commercial use.

Victoria Ward Limited

The Victoria Ward Limited acts as the owner and operator of Victoria Ward Centers; it operates as a The Howard Hughes Corporation. The company owns approximately 65 acres in Honolulu, including the Ward Entertainment Center, Ward Warehouse, Ward Village, and Village Shops.

References 

Buildings and structures in Honolulu
Shopping malls in Hawaii
Tourist attractions in Honolulu